The 1996–97 Croatian Football Cup was the sixth edition of Croatia's football knockout competition. Croatia Zagreb were the defending champions, and they won their second successive title.

Calendar

First round

Second round

Quarter-finals

|}

Semi-finals

First legs

Second legs

Croatia Zagreb won 2–1 on aggregate.

NK Zagreb won 6–2 on aggregate.

Final

See also
1996–97 Croatian First Football League

External links
Official website 
1996–97 in Croatian football at Rec.Sport.Soccer Statistics Foundation
1997 Cup Final at Rec.Sport.Soccer Statistics Foundation

Croatian Football Cup seasons
Croatian Cup, 1996-97
Croatian Cup, 1996-97